Markeyite, a uranyl carbonate mineral discovered in the Markey Mine in Utah, USA. A group led by Anthony R. Kampf, a mineralogist at the Natural History Museum of Los Angeles County, USA discovered its structure.

Cotype material for this mineral resides in the collections of the Natural History Museum, Los Angeles County, USA, and the Fersman Mineralogical Museum, Russian Academy of Sciences, Russia.

Localities 
USA: Markey mine, Red Canyon, White Canyon District, San Juan Co., Utah

References 

Carbonate minerals
Orthorhombic minerals